Nobody Knows You is a studio album by Steep Canyon Rangers released in 2012 through Rounder Records.  In January 2013, the record won the Grammy Award for Best Bluegrass Album which was presented to Steep Canyon Rangers as artists and co-producers of the album alongside Gary Paczosa.  The album peaked at #2 on Billboard Top Bluegrass Albums chart.

Track listing

Personnel
 Charles R Humphrey III - bass, harmony vocals
 Mike Guggino - mandolin, mandola, harmony vocals
 Woody Platt - guitar, vocals
 Nicky Sanders - fiddle, vocals
 Graham Sharp - banjo, guitar, vocals

Guests
 John Gardner - drums (track 12)
 Randy Kohrs - resonator guitar (track 9)
 Jon Randall - guitar (track 9)
 Jimmy Wallace - piano (track 3)

References

2012 albums
Grammy Award for Best Bluegrass Album
Rounder Records albums
Steep Canyon Rangers albums